The tournament in Asunción was a new addition to the ITF Women's Circuit.

Bianca Botto won the title, defeating Florencia Molinero in the final, 6–3, 6–2.

Seeds

Main draw

Finals

Top half

Bottom half

References 
 Main draw

CIT Paraguay Open - Singles